The Kamal Nath ministry was the Council of Ministers in 15th Madhya Pradesh Legislative Assembly headed by Chief Minister Kamal Nath.

All the ministers were of Cabinet rank. Due to the political crisis in the month of March 2020, the ministry lasted for only 15 months i.e. from 17 December 2018 to 20 March 2020.

Council of Ministers

Former Members

On 9 March 2020, due to the Political turmoil situation created by senior congress leader Jyotiraditya Scindia, an emergency cabinet meeting was held at the residence of Chief Minister Kamal Nath, where 16 ministers tendered their resignations in order to reconstitute the cabinet.

All the ministers expressed their faith in Chief Minister Kamal Nath and gave him free hand to reconstitute the cabinet.

All the ministers who resigned are considered to be close to Chief Minister Kamal Nath and Former Chief Minister Digvijaya Singh.

On 14 March 2020, the Governor of Madhya Pradesh, Lalji Tandon removed 6 ministers supporting Jyotiraditya Scindia. Chief Minister Kamal Nath had made the recommendation to the Governor to remove these 6 ministers.

On 20 March 2020, Chief Minister Kamal Nath resigned from the post of Chief Minister of Madhya Pradesh, after he failed to convince the Rebel Congress MLAs, who were campaigning in a resort in Bengaluru.

References

Nath
Indian National Congress state ministries
2018 establishments in Kerala
2020 disestablishments in India
Cabinets established in 2018
Cabinets disestablished in 2020